Trechus subnotatus is a species of ground beetle in the Trechinae subfamily.

Description

References

Beetles described in 1831
subnotatus